Kabari Bazar is a flea market located in Rawalpindi, Pakistan. 

Kabari Bazar is known as a marketplace of second-hand goods in Rawalpindi. Apart from other goods, military equipment, including military uniform and military boots are also sold there. Some shops also sell smuggled NATO supplies.

See also
 American Market

References

Further reading
Khan, Ali (2015). Rawul Pindee: The Raj Years 

Shopping districts and streets in Pakistan
Tourist attractions in Rawalpindi
Populated places in Rawalpindi City
Rawalpindi City
Bazaars in Rawalpindi
Flea markets